La Arena is a corregimiento in Chitré District, Herrera Province, Panama with a population of 7,586 as of 2010. Its population as of 1990 was 4,993; its population as of 2000 was 6,429.

References

Corregimientos of Herrera Province